Dear Miles is an album by American bassist Ron Carter recorded in 2006 and originally released on the Japanese Somethin' Else label with a US release on Blue Note Records.

Reception

The AllMusic review by Scott Yanow said "Dear Miles is a cheerful and upbeat session, most highly recommended to listeners who enjoy hearing a lot of bass solos". In JazzTimes, Doug Ramsey stated "Dear Miles maintains Carter’s high standard ... This is music-making at the highest level". On All About Jazz, J. Hunter wrote "Dear Miles is a fantastic set of bold interpretations; it is respectful to its subject while never losing its need to be unique. I'd say that sounds like Miles to a T".

Track listing 

 "Gone" (Gil Evans) – 4:47
 "Seven Steps to Heaven" (Miles Davis, Victor Feldman) – 4:53
 "My Funny Valentine" (Richard Rodgers, Lorenz Hart) – 8:04
 "Bags' Groove" (Milt Jackson) – 3:43
 "Someday My Prince Will Come" (Frank Churchill, Larry Morey) – 6:45
 "Cut and Paste" (Ron Carter) – 4:37
 "Stella by Starlight" (Victor Young, Ned Washington) – 5:03
 "As Time Goes By" (Herman Hupfeld) – 4:58
 "Bye Bye Blackbird" (Ray Henderson, Mort Dixon) – 5:28
 "595" (Ron Carter) – 4:36

Personnel 
Ron Carter - bass 
Stephen Scott – piano
Payton Crossley – drums
Roger Squitero – percussion

References 

Ron Carter albums
2007 albums
Blue Note Records albums
Miles Davis tribute albums